Nasser Abul is a Kuwaiti online activist. On 7 July 2011, he was imprisoned by the government of Kuwait on state security charges, following a series of tweets in support of  Arab Spring protesters in Bahrain. Sheikh Abdullah Mohammed bin Ahmed Al Fateh Al Khalifa of Bahrain's ruling Al Khalifa family thanked the Kuwaiti government for Abul's arrest and also announced his intention to file a private libel suit against Abul.

Following his arrest, Abul stated that the most inflammatory tweets on his account had been posted by hackers, and that when he became aware of the tweets, he had deleted them with his iPhone. Abul has alleged that he was beaten and subjected to sleep deprivation in the first two days of his detention; according to his lawyer, Abul was also denied counsel for several hearings. One week after his arrest, Amnesty International named him a prisoner of conscience and called for his immediate release. Human Rights Watch also demanded that the charges against him be dropped, with a representative stating that "Kuwait has sunk to a new low by arresting people just for posting criticism of governments on the internet." On 19 September, Kuwaiti MP Faisal Al-Duwaisan, Chairman of the Human Rights Committee, requested Abul's release, calling it "a shame to taint Kuwait’s human rights history".

On 27 September 2011, Abul was released from Kuwait Central Prison.

See also
 Hamad al-Naqi

References

Amnesty International prisoners of conscience held by Kuwait
Kuwaiti activists
Kuwaiti people of Iranian descent
Living people
Year of birth missing (living people)
Kuwaiti prisoners and detainees